Gesualdo Bufalino (Comiso, Italy, 15 November 1920 – 14 June 1996), was an Italian writer.

Biography
Gesualdo Bufalino was born in Comiso, Sicily. He studied literature and was a high-school professor in his hometown, for most of his life. Immediately after World War II, he had to spend some time in a hospital for tuberculosis; hence he drew the material for the novel Diceria dell'untore (The Plague Sower). The book was written in 1950 and completed in 1971, but was published only in 1981, thanks to Bufalino's friend and well-known writer Leonardo Sciascia who discovered his talents. Diceria dell'untore won the Premio Campiello. In 1988, the novel Le menzogne della notte (Night's Lies) won the Strega Prize. In 1990 he won the Nino Martoglio International Book Award.
In his native town the Biblioteca di Bufalino ("Bufalino's Library") is now named after him.

Bibliography
Works available in English

 The Plague Sower, translated by Stephen Sartarelli and with an introduction by Leonardo Sciascia, Hygiene (CO): Eridanos Press, 1988; translated as The Plague-spreader's Tale by Patrick Creagh, London: Harvill, 1999. 
 Blind Argus, translated by Patrick Creagh, London: Harvill, 1989, 1992. For this translation Patrick Creagh won the John Florio Prize.
 Night's Lies, translated by Patrick Creagh, London: Harvill, 1990; as Lies of the night, New York: Atheneum, 1991.
 The Keeper of Ruins and Other Inventions, translated by Patrick Creagh, London: Harvill, 1994.
 Tommaso and the Blind Photographer, translated by Patrick Creagh, London : Harvill Press, 2000.

Further reading
Critics works available in Italian:
 Verga e il cinema. Con una sceneggiatura verghiana inedita di Cavalleria rusticana, testo di Gesualdo Bufalino a cura di Nino Genovese e Sebastiano Gesù, Catania, 1996
Sarah Zappulla Muscarà (a cura di), Narratori siciliani del secondo dopoguerra, Giuseppe Maimone Editore, Catania 1990

See also
Breath of Life, film adaptation of Diceria dell'untore.

References

External links

1920 births
1996 deaths
People from Comiso
Italian male poets
Italian male short story writers
20th-century Italian male writers
Writers from the Province of Ragusa
Strega Prize winners
20th-century Italian novelists
20th-century Italian poets
Italian male novelists
Premio Campiello winners
20th-century Italian short story writers